Ashantina is a genus of flies in the family Stratiomyidae.

Species
Ashantina antennata Kertész, 1914
Ashantina dubia (Séguy, 1953)

References

Stratiomyidae
Brachycera genera
Taxa named by Kálmán Kertész
Diptera of Africa